Atomic Twister is a 2002 American made-for-television disaster film starring Sharon Lawrence and Mark-Paul Gosselaar which revolves around a series of tornadoes that damage a nuclear reactor in a small town in western Tennessee, in turn causing a near-meltdown at the plant. The film originally premiered on TBS Superstation on June 9, 2002.

Plot
A series of tornadoes cripple Hellman-Klein Nuclear Power Plant in Basset County, West Tennessee by damaging a power transformer and a generator, killing the plant's security guard Stu (Carl Lewis) in the process, and leaving the plant with very little power to operate. Hellman-Klein's shift supervisor Corrine Maguire sets out to try and contact the NRC, while an operator shuts down non-vital systems, which include the electric pumps to reduce power. Just then, a second tornado hits the plant, damaging the diesel pumps, losing almost all controls. Meanwhile, Campbell Maguire (Daniel Costello), the plant's shift supervisor's 12-year old son, is caught in the twisters. His babysitter, Stacy is killed and he runs away towards the plant on his bike.

When the diesel pumps fail, the staff try to restart the electric pumps, but they won't respond. The nuclear reactor overheats, causing coolant to evaporate from the waste pool, threatening to expose radioactive material. The staff attempt to initiate SCRAM procedures to try to shut down the nuclear reactor, but the computer fails to respond. With no communications between the plant and the sheriff's department and the Nuclear Regulatory Commission; leaving them on their own, Corrine, Potter, and Neville venture inside the containment room to shut down the reactor manually, but radiation leakage prevents them from doing so. Neville (John Summer) decides to manually shut down the reactor himself in order to divert the reactor's coolant to the waste pool to buy the operators more time, taking full responsibility for ordering them to shut down the electrical pumps while Corrine is away trying to establish contact. He successfully does so, but is now locked himself inside the containment room.

A Deputy Sheriff named Jake (Mark-Paul Gosselaar), a friend of Corrine, and whose mother was killed by a tornado during his childhood, searches for Campbell and finds him on the road. Together they make their way to safety at Corinne's request. On the way they discover Jake's girlfriend, Ashley (Charmaine Guest), trapped on a steep hillside in her car. Jake goes down to rescue her.  Both Jake and Ashley are nearly killed when her car slides over the cliff but Campbell saves their lives, risking his own to do it when he is given an option to escape. Jake lauds Campbell as a hero and lets a relieved Corrine know of her son's survival and heroism.

Firemen who arrived at the site began spraying water into the reactor pool, but it only slows down the evaporation. Meanwhile, a disused diesel generator is found in the original blueprints by the NRC, and the plant workers plan to hook it up to the electric pumps to save the plant. They order some diesel fuel for it, but the tanker truck driver panics at the idea of driving in the adverse weather. Jake, a former truck driver, intercepts the fleeing truck driver and delivers the diesel to the plant himself. At the plant, the heat is starting to prove too much for the firemen and they start to pass out while the water from the hoses is having very little effect. Mere minutes before meltdown, Jake helps the firefighters while Corrine hooks up the fuel and attempts to start the generator, eventually she is able to turn it on. With the generator running, the pumps restart and the waste pool starts to refill. Although the plant is damaged, a nuclear meltdown is averted.

Campbell and Corrine are finally reunited and held together as Jake and Ashley set a date to get married. Corrine and Neville; who has suffered terminal radiation poisoning from being trapped inside of the locked reactor containment room, looked at each other before she thanked the latter for his "self-sacrifice" as Neville is taken away to the hospital.

Cast
 Mark-Paul Gosselaar as Deputy Jake Hannah 
Jared Michael Thomas as Young Jake 
 Sharon Lawrence as Corinne Maguire
Joanna Morrison as Stacy
 Carl Lewis as Securityman Stu 
 Jonathan Blick as Potter (as Johnny Blick) 
Meryl Main as Gail Clark 
 Daniel Costello as Campbell Maguire 
 Charmaine Guest as Ashley Bishop 
 George Henare as Manuel Fluentez 
 John Leigh as Deputy Rollins 
 John Sumner as Neville 
 Corbin Bernsen as Sheriff C.B. Bishop 
 David Aston as Man at Cliff 
 Paul Barrett as Fuel Tanker Driver 
 Grant Bridger as Maguire's Neighbor 
 Katrina Devine as Gloria 
 Peter Feeney as Fireman

Real-life inspiration 
This television film was based on a real-life disaster that had taken place on June 24. 1998, when an F2 tornado hit the Davis-Besse Nuclear Power Station in Ohio resulting in the loss of off-site power. Despite that, the film bears no resemblance to the actual events at Davis-Besse.

Location
Despite taking place in Tennessee, the film was shot in New Zealand. Locations included Huntly Power Station, Meremere Power Station and a farm along State Highway 2.

Streaming release
Since 2019, the film is available for streaming online on The Roku Channel, IMDb TV, Vudu, Tubi TV and YouTube Premium.

External links
 
 
 

2002 television films
2002 films
2000s disaster films
American disaster films
TBS original films
Films directed by Bill Corcoran
Films about tornadoes
Films set in Tennessee
Films shot in New Zealand
Films about nuclear accidents and incidents
Disaster television films
Nuclear accidents in fiction
2000s English-language films
2000s American films